Ryan O'Reilly may refer to: 

Ryan O'Reilly (born 1991), Canadian ice hockey player
Konnor (wrestler) (born 1980), American wrestler also known as Ryan O'Reilly

See also
Ryan O'Reily, a character from the television show Oz